Westerstede-Ocholt is a railway station located in Ocholt, Germany. The station is located on the Oldenburg–Leer railway. The train services are operated by Deutsche Bahn.

Train services
The following services currently call at the station:

Intercity services (IC ): Norddeich - Emden - Leer - Bremen - Hannover - Braunschweig - Magdeburg - Leipzig / Berlin - Cottbus
Regional services : Norddeich - Emden - Oldenburg - Bremen - Nienburg - Hanover

References

External links 
 

Railway stations in Lower Saxony
Buildings and structures in Ammerland